That Remix Sucks is a remix EP of Tilly and the Wall songs, released as a digital download in 2009 from Team Love Library.

Track listing 
 Beat Control (La La Lepus Remix) - 7:14
 The Freest Man (CSS Remix) - 5:05
 Bad Education (No Context Remix) - 9:13
 Beat Control (James Yuill Remix) - 4:37
 Beat Control (Tom Knight Remix) - 4:55

External links 
Blog review and interview

2009 EPs
Tilly and the Wall albums
2009 remix albums
Remix EPs